USS Mizar may refer to the following ships of the United States Navy:

, was a cargo ship during World War II
, was an oceanographic research ship and submarine rescue ship

United States Navy ship names